Midnight Machine Gun Rhymes and Alibis is the tenth album by rapper, Andre Nickatina, released in conjunction with rapper Equipto. It was released on March 22, 2002 for Fillmoe Coleman Records and was produced by various producers which included Andre Nickatina, Equipto, Nick Peace, Crush, Little J, DJ Soleil, Prince Marvelous and Laird. This was the first of four collaborations between Andre Nickatina and Equipto.

Track listing
"Fa Show"- 3:31  
"Jungle"- 4:45  
"Pitbull Terrier"- 3:12  
"P-Nut Butter Breakdown"- 5:12  
"Public Enemy #7"- 3:12  
"Dowutigotta"- 4:53  
"Wut U Mean"- 4:26  
"The Alibi"- 2:46  
"Stay Hungry"- 3:36  
"Pumped"- 3:19  
"That!"- 3:35  
"Cops and Robbers"- 3:36  
"Bonus Track"- 1:37  
"Say Hey"- 4:53  
"Blueprints of War"- 8:17

2002 albums
Andre Nickatina albums